Jean-Claude Bouchard (born 25 September 1940 in Saint-Éloi, Quebec) is a Canadian clergyman and bishop for the Roman Catholic Diocese of Pala. He became ordained in 1969. He was appointed bishop in 1977. He retired in 2020.

References

External links

20th-century Canadian Roman Catholic priests
1940 births
People from Bas-Saint-Laurent
Living people
20th-century Roman Catholic bishops in Chad
21st-century Roman Catholic bishops in Chad
Roman Catholic bishops of Pala